ENIAC (Electronic Numerical Integrator and Computer) was the first programmable, electronic, general-purpose digital computer, completed in 1945. There were other computers that had combinations of these features, but the ENIAC had all of them in one package. It was Turing-complete and able to solve "a large class of numerical problems" through reprogramming.

Although ENIAC was designed and primarily used to calculate artillery firing tables for the United States Army's Ballistic Research Laboratory (which later became a part of the Army Research Laboratory), its first program was a study of the feasibility of the thermonuclear weapon.

ENIAC was completed in 1945 and first put to work for practical purposes on December 10, 1945.

ENIAC was formally dedicated at the University of Pennsylvania on February 15, 1946, having cost $487,000, and called a "Giant Brain" by the press. It had a speed on the order of one thousand times faster than that of electro-mechanical machines; this computational power, coupled with general-purpose programmability, excited scientists and industrialists alike. The combination of speed and programmability allowed for thousands more calculations for problems.

ENIAC was formally accepted by the U.S. Army Ordnance Corps in July 1946. It was transferred to Aberdeen Proving Ground, Maryland in 1947, where it was in continuous operation until 1955.

Development and design
ENIAC's design and construction was financed by the United States Army, Ordnance Corps, Research and Development Command, led by Major General Gladeon M. Barnes. The total cost was about $487,000, . The construction contract was signed on June 5, 1943; work on the computer began in secret at the University of Pennsylvania's Moore School of Electrical Engineering the following month, under the code name "Project PX", with John Grist Brainerd as principal investigator. Herman H. Goldstine persuaded the Army to fund the project, which put him in charge to oversee it for them.

ENIAC was designed by Ursinus College physics professor John Mauchly and J. Presper Eckert of the University of Pennsylvania, U.S. The team of design engineers assisting the development included Robert F. Shaw (function tables), Jeffrey Chuan Chu (divider/square-rooter), Thomas Kite Sharpless (master programmer), Frank Mural (master programmer), Arthur Burks (multiplier), Harry Huskey (reader/printer) and Jack Davis (accumulators). Significant development work was undertaken by the female mathematicians who handled the bulk of the ENIAC programming: Jean Jennings, Marlyn Wescoff, Ruth Lichterman, Betty Snyder, Frances Bilas, and Kay McNulty. In 1946, the researchers resigned from the University of Pennsylvania and formed the Eckert–Mauchly Computer Corporation.

ENIAC was a large, modular computer, composed of individual panels to perform different functions. Twenty of these modules were accumulators that could not only add and subtract, but hold a ten-digit decimal number in memory. Numbers were passed between these units across several general-purpose buses (or trays, as they were called). In order to achieve its high speed, the panels had to send and receive numbers, compute, save the answer and trigger the next operation, all without any moving parts. Key to its versatility was the ability to branch; it could trigger different operations, depending on the sign of a computed result.

Components

By the end of its operation in 1956, ENIAC contained 18,000 vacuum tubes, 7,200 crystal diodes, 1,500 relays, 70,000 resistors, 10,000 capacitors, and approximately 5,000,000 hand-soldered joints. This power requirement led to the rumor that whenever the computer was switched on, lights in Philadelphia dimmed. Input was possible from an IBM card reader and an IBM card punch was used for output. These cards could be used to produce printed output offline using an IBM accounting machine, such as the IBM 405. While ENIAC had no system to store memory in its inception, these punch cards could be used for external memory storage. In 1953, a 100-word magnetic-core memory built by the Burroughs Corporation was added to ENIAC.

ENIAC used ten-position ring counters to store digits; each digit required 36 vacuum tubes, 10 of which were the dual triodes making up the flip-flops of the ring counter. Arithmetic was performed by "counting" pulses with the ring counters and generating carry pulses if the counter "wrapped around", the idea being to electronically emulate the operation of the digit wheels of a mechanical adding machine.

ENIAC had 20 ten-digit signed accumulators, which used ten's complement representation and could perform 5,000 simple addition or subtraction operations between any of them and a source (e.g., another accumulator or a constant transmitter) per second. It was possible to connect several accumulators to run simultaneously, so the peak speed of operation was potentially much higher, due to parallel operation.

It was possible to wire the carry of one accumulator into another accumulator to perform arithmetic with double the precision, but the accumulator carry circuit timing prevented the wiring of three or more for even higher precision. ENIAC used four of the accumulators (controlled by a special multiplier unit) to perform up to 385 multiplication operations per second; five of the accumulators were controlled by a special divider/square-rooter unit to perform up to 40 division operations per second or three square root operations per second.

The other nine units in ENIAC were the initiating unit (started and stopped the machine), the cycling unit (used for synchronizing the other units), the master programmer (controlled loop sequencing), the reader (controlled an IBM punch-card reader), the printer (controlled an IBM card punch), the constant transmitter, and three function tables.

Operation times
The references by Rojas and Hashagen (or Wilkes) give more details about the times for operations, which differ somewhat from those stated above.

The basic machine cycle was 200 microseconds (20 cycles of the 100 kHz clock in the cycling unit), or 5,000 cycles per second for operations on the 10-digit numbers. In one of these cycles, ENIAC could write a number to a register, read a number from a register, or add/subtract two numbers.

A multiplication of a 10-digit number by a d-digit number (for d up to 10) took d+4 cycles, so a 10- by 10-digit multiplication took 14 cycles, or 2,800 microseconds—a rate of 357 per second. If one of the numbers had fewer than 10 digits, the operation was faster.

Division and square roots took 13(d+1) cycles, where d is the number of digits in the result (quotient or square root). So a division or square root took up to 143 cycles, or 28,600 microseconds—a rate of 35 per second. (Wilkes 1956:20 states that a division with a 10 digit quotient required 6 milliseconds.) If the result had fewer than ten digits, it was obtained faster.

ENIAC is able to process about 500 FLOPS, compared to modern supercomputers' petascale and exascale computing power.

Reliability
ENIAC used common octal-base radio tubes of the day; the decimal accumulators were made of 6SN7 flip-flops, while 6L7s, 6SJ7s, 6SA7s and 6AC7s were used in logic functions. Numerous 6L6s and 6V6s served as line drivers to drive pulses through cables between rack assemblies.

Several tubes burned out almost every day, leaving ENIAC nonfunctional about half the time. Special high-reliability tubes were not available until 1948. Most of these failures, however, occurred during the warm-up and cool-down periods, when the tube heaters and cathodes were under the most thermal stress. Engineers reduced ENIAC's tube failures to the more acceptable rate of one tube every two days. According to an interview in 1989 with Eckert, "We had a tube fail about every two days and we could locate the problem within 15 minutes."
In 1954, the longest continuous period of operation without a failure was 116 hours—close to five days.

Programming
ENIAC could be programmed to perform complex sequences of operations, including loops, branches, and subroutines. However, instead of the stored-program computers that exist today, ENIAC was just a large collection of arithmetic machines, which originally had programs set up into the machine by a combination of plugboard wiring and three portable function tables (containing 1,200 ten-way switches each). The task of taking a problem and mapping it onto the machine was complex, and usually took weeks. Due to the complexity of mapping programs onto the machine, programs were only changed after huge numbers of tests of the current program. After the program was figured out on paper, the process of getting the program into ENIAC by manipulating its switches and cables could take days. This was followed by a period of verification and debugging, aided by the ability to execute the program step by step. A programming tutorial for the modulo function using an ENIAC simulator gives an impression of what a program on the ENIAC looked like.

ENIAC's six primary programmers, Kay McNulty, Betty Jennings, Betty Snyder, Marlyn Wescoff, Fran Bilas and Ruth Lichterman, not only determined how to input ENIAC programs, but also developed an understanding of ENIAC's inner workings. The programmers were often able to narrow bugs down to an individual failed tube which could be pointed to for replacement by a technician.

Programmers

Kay McNulty, Betty Jennings, Betty Snyder, Marlyn Meltzer, Fran Bilas, and Ruth Lichterman were the first programmers of the ENIAC. They were not, as computer scientist and historian Kathryn Kleiman was once told, "refrigerator ladies", i.e., models posing in front of the machine for press photography. Nevertheless, some of the women did not receive recognition for their work on the ENIAC in their lifetimes. After the war ended, the women continued to work on the ENIAC. Their expertise made their positions difficult to replace with returning soldiers.

These early programmers were drawn from a group of about two hundred women employed as computers at the Moore School of Electrical Engineering at the University of Pennsylvania. The job of computers was to produce the numeric result of mathematical formulas needed for a scientific study, or an engineering project. They usually did so with a mechanical calculator. The women studied the machine's logic, physical structure, operation, and circuitry in order to not only understand the mathematics of computing, but also the machine itself. This was one of the few technical job categories available to women at that time. Betty Holberton (née Snyder) continued on to help write the first generative programming system (SORT/MERGE) and help design the first commercial electronic computers, the UNIVAC and the BINAC, alongside Jean Jennings. McNulty developed the use of subroutines in order to help increase ENIAC's computational capability.

Herman Goldstine selected the programmers, whom he called operators, from the computers who had been calculating ballistics tables with mechanical desk calculators, and a differential analyzer prior to and during the development of ENIAC. Under Herman and Adele Goldstine's direction, the computers studied ENIAC's blueprints and physical structure to determine how to manipulate its switches and cables, as programming languages did not yet exist. Though contemporaries considered programming a clerical task and did not publicly recognize the programmers' effect on the successful operation and announcement of ENIAC, McNulty, Jennings, Snyder, Wescoff, Bilas, and Lichterman have since been recognized for their contributions to computing. Three of the current (2020) Army supercomputers Jean, Kay, and Betty are named for Jean Bartik (Betty Jennings), Kay McNulty, and Betty Snyder respectively.

The "programmer" and "operator" job titles were not originally considered professions suitable for women. The labor shortage created by World War II helped enable the entry of women into the field. However, the field was not viewed as prestigious, and bringing in women was viewed as a way to free men up for more skilled labor. Essentially, women were seen as meeting a need in a temporary crisis. For example, the National Advisory Committee for Aeronautics said in 1942, "It is felt that enough greater return is obtained by freeing the engineers from calculating detail to overcome any increased expenses in the computers' salaries. The engineers admit themselves that the girl computers do the work more rapidly and accurately than they would. This is due in large measure to the feeling among the engineers that their college and industrial experience is being wasted and thwarted by mere repetitive calculation".

Following the initial six programmers, an expanded team of a hundred scientists was recruited to continue work on the ENIAC. Among these were several women, including Gloria Ruth Gordon. Adele Goldstine wrote the original technical description of the ENIAC.

Programming languages 

Several language systems were developed to describe programs for the ENIAC, including:

Role in the hydrogen bomb
Although the Ballistic Research Laboratory was the sponsor of ENIAC, one year into this three-year project John von Neumann, a mathematician working on the hydrogen bomb at Los Alamos National Laboratory, became aware of this computer. Los Alamos subsequently became so involved with ENIAC that the first test problem run consisted of computations for the hydrogen bomb, not artillery tables. The input/output for this test was one million cards.

Role in development of the Monte Carlo methods

Related to ENIAC's role in the hydrogen bomb was its role in the Monte Carlo method becoming popular. Scientists involved in the original nuclear bomb development used massive groups of people doing huge numbers of calculations ("computers" in the terminology of the time) to investigate the distance that neutrons would likely travel through various materials. John von Neumann and Stanislaw Ulam realized the speed of ENIAC would allow these calculations to be done much more quickly. The success of this project showed the value of Monte Carlo methods in science.

Later developments
A press conference was held on February 1, 1946, and the completed machine was announced to the public the evening of February 14, 1946, featuring demonstrations of its capabilities. Elizabeth Snyder and Betty Jean Jennings were responsible for developing the demonstration trajectory program, although Herman and Adele Goldstine took credit for it. The machine was formally dedicated the next day at the University of Pennsylvania. None of the women involved in programming the machine or creating the demonstration were invited to the formal dedication nor to the celebratory dinner held afterwards.

The original contract amount was $61,700; the final cost was almost $500,000 (approximately ). It was formally accepted by the U.S. Army Ordnance Corps in July 1946. ENIAC was shut down on November 9, 1946, for a refurbishment and a memory upgrade, and was transferred to Aberdeen Proving Ground, Maryland in 1947. There, on July 29, 1947, it was turned on and was in continuous operation until 11:45 p.m. on October 2, 1955.

Role in the development of the EDVAC
A few months after ENIAC's unveiling in the summer of 1946, as part of "an extraordinary effort to jump-start research in the field", the Pentagon invited "the top people in electronics and mathematics from the United States and Great Britain" to a series of forty-eight lectures given in Philadelphia, Pennsylvania; all together called The Theory and Techniques for Design of Digital Computers—more often named the Moore School Lectures. Half of these lectures were given by the inventors of ENIAC.

ENIAC was a one-of-a-kind design and was never repeated. The freeze on design in 1943 meant that it lacked some innovations that soon became well-developed, notably the ability to store a program. Eckert and Mauchly started work on a new design, to be later called the EDVAC, which would be both simpler and more powerful. In particular, in 1944 Eckert wrote his description of a memory unit (the mercury delay line) which would hold both the data and the program. John von Neumann, who was consulting for the Moore School on the EDVAC, sat in on the Moore School meetings at which the stored program concept was elaborated. Von Neumann wrote up an incomplete set of notes (First Draft of a Report on the EDVAC) which were intended to be used as an internal memorandum—describing, elaborating, and couching in formal logical language the ideas developed in the meetings. ENIAC administrator and security officer Herman Goldstine distributed copies of this First Draft to a number of government and educational institutions, spurring widespread interest in the construction of a new generation of electronic computing machines, including Electronic Delay Storage Automatic Calculator (EDSAC) at Cambridge University, England and SEAC at the U.S. Bureau of Standards.

Improvements
A number of improvements were made to ENIAC after 1947, including a primitive read-only stored programming mechanism using the function tables as program ROM, after which programming was done by setting the switches. The idea has been worked out in several variants by Richard Clippinger and his group, on the one hand, and the Goldstines, on the other, and it was included in the ENIAC patent. Clippinger consulted with von Neumann on what instruction set to implement. Clippinger had thought of a three-address architecture while von Neumann proposed a one-address architecture because it was simpler to implement. Three digits of one accumulator (#6) were used as the program counter, another accumulator (#15) was used as the main accumulator, a third accumulator (#8) was used as the address pointer for reading data from the function tables, and most of the other accumulators (1–5, 7, 9–14, 17–19) were used for data memory.

In March 1948 the converter unit was installed, which made possible programming through the reader from standard IBM cards. The "first production run" of the new coding techniques on the Monte Carlo problem followed in April. After ENIAC's move to Aberdeen, a register panel for memory was also constructed, but it did not work. A small master control unit to turn the machine on and off was also added.

The programming of the stored program for ENIAC was done by Betty Jennings, Clippinger, Adele Goldstine and others. It was first demonstrated as a stored-program computer in April 1948, running a program by Adele Goldstine for John von Neumann. This modification reduced the speed of ENIAC by a factor of 6 and eliminated the ability of parallel computation, but as it also reduced the reprogramming time to hours instead of days, it was considered well worth the loss of performance. Also analysis had shown that due to differences between the electronic speed of computation and the electromechanical speed of input/output, almost any real-world problem was completely I/O bound, even without making use of the original machine's parallelism. Most computations would still be I/O bound, even after the speed reduction imposed by this modification.

Early in 1952, a high-speed shifter was added, which improved the speed for shifting by a factor of five. In July 1953, a 100-word expansion core memory was added to the system, using binary-coded decimal, excess-3 number representation. To support this expansion memory, ENIAC was equipped with a new Function Table selector, a memory address selector, pulse-shaping circuits, and three new orders were added to the programming mechanism.

Comparison with other early computers

Mechanical computing machines have been around since Archimedes' time (see: Antikythera mechanism), but the 1930s and 1940s are considered the beginning of the modern computer era.

ENIAC was, like the IBM Harvard Mark I and the German Z3, able to run an arbitrary sequence of mathematical operations, but did not read them from a tape. Like the British Colossus, it was programmed by plugboard and switches. ENIAC combined full, Turing-complete programmability with electronic speed. The Atanasoff–Berry Computer (ABC), ENIAC, and Colossus all used thermionic valves (vacuum tubes). ENIAC's registers performed decimal arithmetic, rather than binary arithmetic like the Z3, the ABC and Colossus.

Like the Colossus, ENIAC required rewiring to reprogram until April 1948. In June 1948, the Manchester Baby ran its first program and earned the distinction of first electronic stored-program computer. Though the idea of a stored-program computer with combined memory for program and data was conceived during the development of ENIAC, it was not initially implemented in ENIAC because World War II priorities required the machine to be completed quickly, and ENIAC's 20 storage locations would be too small to hold data and programs.

Public knowledge
The Z3 and Colossus were developed independently of each other, and of the ABC and ENIAC during World War II. Work on the ABC at Iowa State University was stopped in 1942 after John Atanasoff was called to Washington, D.C., to do physics research for the U.S. Navy, and it was subsequently dismantled. The Z3 was destroyed by the Allied bombing raids of Berlin in 1943. As the ten Colossus machines were part of the UK's war effort their existence remained secret until the late 1970s, although knowledge of their capabilities remained among their UK staff and invited Americans. ENIAC, by contrast, was put through its paces for the press in 1946, "and captured the world's imagination". Older histories of computing may therefore not be comprehensive in their coverage and analysis of this period. All but two of the Colossus machines were dismantled in 1945; the remaining two were used to decrypt Soviet messages by GCHQ until the 1960s. The public demonstration for ENIAC was developed by Snyder and Jennings who created a demo that would calculate the trajectory of a missile in 15 seconds, a task that would have taken several weeks for a human computer.

Patent

For a variety of reasonsincluding Mauchly's June 1941 examination of the Atanasoff–Berry computer (ABC), prototyped in 1939 by John Atanasoff and Clifford Berry for ENIAC, applied for in 1947 and granted in 1964, was voided by the 1973 decision of the landmark federal court case Honeywell, Inc. v. Sperry Rand Corp.. The decision included: that the ENIAC inventors had derived the subject matter of the electronic digital computer from Atanasoff;  gave legal recognition to Atanasoff as the inventor of the first electronic digital computer; and put the invention of the electronic digital computer in the public domain.

Main parts

The main parts were 40 panels and three portable function tables (named A, B, and C). The layout of the panels was (clockwise, starting with the left wall):
Left wall
 Initiating Unit
 Cycling Unit
 Master Programmer – panel 1 and 2
 Function Table 1 – panel 1 and 2
 Accumulator 1
 Accumulator 2
 Divider and Square Rooter
 Accumulator 3
 Accumulator 4
 Accumulator 5
 Accumulator 6
 Accumulator 7
 Accumulator 8
 Accumulator 9

 Back wall
 Accumulator 10
 High-speed Multiplier – panel 1, 2, and 3
 Accumulator 11
 Accumulator 12
 Accumulator 13
 Accumulator 14

 Right wall
 Accumulator 15
 Accumulator 16
 Accumulator 17
 Accumulator 18
 Function Table 2 – panel 1 and 2
 Function Table 3 – panel 1 and 2
 Accumulator 19
 Accumulator 20
 Constant Transmitter – panel 1, 2, and 3
 Printer – panel 1, 2, and 3
An IBM card reader was attached to Constant Transmitter panel 3 and an IBM card punch was attached to Printer Panel 2. The Portable Function Tables could be connected to Function Table 1, 2, and 3.

Parts on display

Pieces of ENIAC are held by the following institutions:
 The School of Engineering and Applied Science at the University of Pennsylvania has four of the original forty panels (Accumulator #18, Constant Transmitter Panel 2, Master Programmer Panel 2, and the Cycling Unit) and one of the three function tables (Function Table B) of ENIAC (on loan from the Smithsonian).
 The Smithsonian has five panels (Accumulators 2, 19, and 20; Constant Transmitter panels 1 and 3; Divider and Square Rooter; Function Table 2 panel 1; Function Table 3 panel 2; High-speed Multiplier panels 1 and 2; Printer panel 1; Initiating Unit) in the National Museum of American History in Washington, D.C. (but apparently not currently on display).
 The Science Museum in London has a receiver unit on display.
 The Computer History Museum in Mountain View, California has three panels (Accumulator #12, Function Table 2 panel 2, and Printer Panel 3) and portable function table C on display (on loan from the Smithsonian Institution).
 The University of Michigan in Ann Arbor has four panels (two accumulators, High-speed Multiplier panel 3, and Master Programmer panel 2), salvaged by Arthur Burks.
 The United States Army Ordnance Museum at Aberdeen Proving Ground, Maryland, where ENIAC was used, has Portable Function Table A.
 The U.S. Army Field Artillery Museum in Fort Sill, as of October 2014, obtained seven panels of ENIAC that were previously housed by The Perot Group in Plano, Texas. There are accumulators #7, #8, #11, and #17; panel #1 and #2 that connected to function table #1, and the back of a panel showing its tubes. A module of tubes is also on display.
 The United States Military Academy at West Point, New York, has one of the data entry terminals from the ENIAC.
 The Heinz Nixdorf Museum in Paderborn, Germany, has three panels (Printer panel 2 and High-speed Function Table) (on loan from the Smithsonian Institution). In 2014 the museum decided to rebuild one of the accumulator panels – reconstructed part has the look and feel of a simplified counterpart from the original machine.

Recognition
ENIAC was named an IEEE Milestone in 1987.

In 1996, in honor of the ENIAC's 50th anniversary, The University of Pennsylvania sponsored a project named, "ENIAC-on-a-Chip", where a very small silicon computer chip measuring 7.44 mm by 5.29 mm was built with the same functionality as ENIAC. Although this 20 MHz chip was many times faster than ENIAC, it had but a fraction of the speed of its contemporary microprocessors in the late 1990s.

In 1997, the six women who did most of the programming of ENIAC were inducted into the Technology International Hall of Fame. The role of the ENIAC programmers is treated in a 2010 documentary film titled Top Secret Rosies: The Female "Computers" of WWII by LeAnn Erickson. A 2014 documentary short, The Computers by Kate McMahon, tells of the story of the six programmers; this was the result of 20 years' research by Kathryn Kleiman and her team as part of the ENIAC Programmers Project. In 2022 Grand Central Publishing released Proving Ground by Kathy Kleiman, a hardcover biography about the six ENIAC programmers and their efforts to translate block diagrams and electronic schematics of the ENIAC, then under construction, into programs that would be loaded into and run on ENIAC once it was available for use.

In 2011, in honor of the 65th anniversary of the ENIAC's unveiling, the city of Philadelphia declared February 15 as ENIAC Day.

The ENIAC celebrated its 70th anniversary on February 15, 2016.

See also
 History of computing
 History of computing hardware
 Women in computing
 List of vacuum-tube computers
 Military computers
 Unisys
 Arthur Burks
 Betty Holberton
 Frances Bilas Spence
 John Mauchly
 J. Presper Eckert
 Jean Jennings Bartik
 Kathleen Antonelli (Kay McNulty)
 Marlyn Meltzer
 Ruth Lichterman Teitelbaum

Notes

References

 
 
 
 
 
 Eckert, J. Presper, The ENIAC (in Nicholas Metropolis, J. Howlett, Gian-Carlo Rota, (editors), A History of Computing in the Twentieth Century, Academic Press, New York, 1980, pp. 525–540)
 Eckert, J. Presper and John Mauchly, 1946, Outline of plans for development of electronic computers, 6 pages. (The founding document in the electronic computer industry.)
 Fritz, W. Barkley, The Women of ENIAC (in IEEE Annals of the History of Computing, Vol. 18, 1996, pp. 13–28)
 
  (also reprinted in The Origins of Digital Computers: Selected Papers, Springer-Verlag, New York, 1982, pp. 359–373)
 
 
 
 
 
 Mauchly, John, The ENIAC (in Metropolis, Nicholas, Howlett, Jack; Rota, Gian-Carlo. 1980, A History of Computing in the Twentieth Century, Academic Press, New York, pp. 541–550, "Original versions of these papers were presented at the International Research Conference on the History of Computing, held at the Los Alamos Scientific Laboratory, 10–15 June 1976.")
 
 Rojas, Raúl; Hashagen, Ulf, editors. The First Computers: History and Architectures, 2000, MIT Press,

Further reading

 Berkeley, Edmund. GIANT BRAINS or machines that think. John Wiley & Sons, inc., 1949. Chapter 7 Speed – 5000 Additions a Second: Moore School's ENIAC (Electronic Numerical Integrator And Computer)
 
 
 Hally, Mike. Electronic Brains: Stories from the Dawn of the Computer Age, Joseph Henry Press, 2005. 
 
 Tompkins, C. B.; Wakelin, J. H.; High-Speed Computing Devices, McGraw-Hill, 1950.

External links

 ENIAC simulation
 Another ENIAC simulation
 Pulse-level ENIAC simulator
 3D printable model of the ENIAC
 Q&A: A lost interview with ENIAC co-inventor J. Presper Eckert
 Interview with Eckert Transcript of a video interview with Eckert by David Allison for the National Museum of American History, Smithsonian Institution on February 2, 1988. An in-depth, technical discussion on ENIAC, including the thought process behind the design.
 Oral history interview with J. Presper Eckert, Charles Babbage Institute, University of Minnesota. Eckert, a co-inventor of ENIAC, discusses its development at the University of Pennsylvania's Moore School of Electrical Engineering; describes difficulties in securing patent rights for ENIAC and the problems posed by the circulation of John von Neumann's 1945 First Draft of the Report on EDVAC, which placed the ENIAC inventions in the public domain. Interview by Nancy Stern, 28 October 1977.
 Oral history interview with Carl Chambers, Charles Babbage Institute, University of Minnesota. Chambers discusses the initiation and progress of the ENIAC project at the University of Pennsylvania Moore School of Electrical Engineering (1941–46). Oral history interview by Nancy B. Stern, 30 November 1977.
 Oral history interview with Irven A. Travis, Charles Babbage Institute, University of Minnesota. Travis describes the ENIAC project at the University of Pennsylvania (1941–46), the technical and leadership abilities of chief engineer Eckert, the working relations between John Mauchly and Eckert, the disputes over patent rights, and their resignation from the university. Oral history interview by Nancy B. Stern, 21 October 1977.
 Oral history interview with S. Reid Warren, Charles Babbage Institute, University of Minnesota. Warren served as supervisor of the EDVAC project; central to his discussion are J. Presper Eckert and John Mauchly and their disagreements with administrators over patent rights; discusses John von Neumann's 1945 draft report on the EDVAC, and its lack of proper acknowledgment of all the EDVAC contributors.
 ENIAC Programmers Project
 The women of ENIAC
 Programming ENIAC
 How ENIAC took a Square Root
 Mike Muuss: Collected ENIAC documents
 ENIAC chapter in Karl Kempf, Electronic Computers Within The Ordnance Corps, November 1961
 The ENIAC Story, Martin H. Weik, Ordnance Ballistic Research Laboratories, 1961
 ENIAC museum at the University of Pennsylvania
 ENIAC specifications from Ballistic Research Laboratories Report No. 971 December 1955, (A Survey of Domestic Electronic Digital Computing Systems)
 A Computer Is Born, Michael Kanellos, 60th anniversary news story, CNet, February 13, 2006
 1946 film restored, Computer History Archives Project

1940s computers
Military computers
One-of-a-kind computers
Vacuum tube computers
Computer-related introductions in 1945
Artillery components
Artillery operation
Military electronics of the United States
University of Pennsylvania
Decimal computers
Serial computers